Rollinia boliviana is a species of plant in the Annonaceae family. It is endemic to Bolivia.

References

boliviana
Endemic flora of Bolivia
Endangered plants
Endangered biota of South America
Taxonomy articles created by Polbot
Taxobox binomials not recognized by IUCN